East Norfolk was a constituency in the county of Norfolk that returned two members of parliament to the House of Commons of the Parliament of the United Kingdom until 1868. A namesake was created in 1885 with representation of one member. That seat was abolished in 1950.

History
The constituency was first created by the Great Reform Act for the 1832 general election, and abolished for the 1868 general election. In that period the Parliamentary County of Norfolk was split into two divisions – Eastern Norfolk and Western Norfolk, each returning two members.

Further to the Reform Act of 1867, Norfolk was reorganised into the North, South and West divisions, with each of the three divisions again returning two members.  The Eastern division was replaced by the bulk of the North and South Divisions.

Under the Redistribution of Seats Act 1885, the three two-member county divisions were replaced with six single-member divisions. The second version of this constituency was one of the single-member seats. It was abolished under the Representation of the People Act 1948, which came into effect for the 1950 general election.

Boundaries and boundary changes
1832–1868: The Hundreds of Blofield, Clavering, Depwade, Diss, Earsham, North Erpingham, South Erpingham, Eynesford, East Flegg, West Flegg, Forehoe, Happing, Henstead, Humbleyard, Loddon, Taversham, Tunstead and Walsham.

1885–1918: The Sessional Divisions of Blofield and Walsham, East and West Flegg, Taversham and Tunstead, and Happing, the part of the Borough of Great Yarmouth in the county of Norfolk, and part of the Sessional Division of South Erpingham.

As Great Yarmouth formed a separate Parliamentary Borough, only non-resident freeholders of the Borough were entitled to vote in this constituency.

1918–1950: The Urban District of North Walsham, and the Rural Districts of Blofield, East and West Flegg, Loddon and Clavering, St Faith's, and Smallburgh.

The division was expanded to the south, with the addition of eastern parts of the Southern Division of Norfolk (Loddon and Clavering Rural District).  Also gained small area to the west from the Northern Division.

On its abolition, the contents of the seat were distributed as follows: North Walsham and the Rural District of Smallburgh to North Norfolk; area to the north and east of Norwich, mostly comprising the (former) Rural District of St Faiths, to the new County Constituency of Central Norfolk; most of the (combined) Rural District of Blofield and Flegg to the new County Constituency of Yarmouth; and the Rural District of Loddon and Clavering (renamed Loddon) back to South Norfolk.

Members of Parliament

1832–1868

1885–1950

Elections

Elections in the 1830s

Elections in the 1840s

Elections in the 1850s

Wodehouse resigned via accepting the office of Steward of the Manor of Hempholme, causing a by-election.

Buxton's death caused a by-election.

Elections in the 1860s

Elections in the 1880s

Elections in the 1890s

Elections in the 1900s

Elections in the 1910s

General Election 1914–15:

Another General Election was required to take place before the end of 1915. The political parties had been making preparations for an election to take place and by July 1914, the following candidates had been selected; 
Liberal: Robert Price
Unionist:

Elections in the 1920s

Elections in the 1930s

General Election 1939–40

Until the parliament elected in 1935 was extended, another general election was required to take place before the end of 1940. The political parties made preparations for an election to take place, and by the autumn of 1939, the following candidates had been selected; 
Liberal National: Frank Medlicott
Labour: Norman Reeve Tillett
Independent Conservative: James F. Wright (Secretary, Norfolk Farmers Union)

Elections in the 1940s

References

 British Parliamentary Election Results 1832–1885, compiled and edited by F.W.S. Craig (The Macmillan Press 1977)

Parliamentary constituencies in Norfolk (historic)
Constituencies of the Parliament of the United Kingdom established in 1832
Constituencies of the Parliament of the United Kingdom disestablished in 1868
Constituencies of the Parliament of the United Kingdom established in 1885
Constituencies of the Parliament of the United Kingdom disestablished in 1950